Nangolo is a name of Namibian origin that may refer to:
Nangolo Ithete (1941–2002), Namibian politician
Nangolo Mbumba (born 1941), Namibian politician
Fillemon Shuumbwa Nangolo (born 1974), reigning king of Ondonga kingdom, a sub-tribe of Owambo people
Mvula ya Nangolo (1943–2019), Namibian journalist and poet

Namibian surnames
Namibian given names